Mosharraf Hossain (known as Engineer Mosharraf Hossain; born 12 January 1943) is a Bangladeshi politician. He is the incumbent Jatiya Sangsad member representing  the Chittagong-1 constituency for  the  6th term. He is a Presidium member of the Bangladesh Awami League currently and was the president of its Chittagong North District unit before. After his graduation from University of Engineering and Technology (Lahore) in 1966 he joined politics and was elected as a Member of Provincial Assembly (MPA) of what was then East Pakistan in 1970. He was also the member of Constituent Assembly of Bangladesh. He served as the minister of two portfolios: Minister of Civil Aviation and Tourism and Minister of Housing and Public Works.

Career
In August 2013, Hossain was included in the Awami League Central Working Committee.

Cabinet minister 
After the general election in 1996, Hossain was appointed as the Minister of Civil Aviation and Tourism. In 2014, he was appointed as the Minister of Public Works and Housing.

Anti-Corruption Commission filed charges against Hossain in May 2007 over irregularities in the allocation of commercial land in Chittagong. On 26 January 2018, a court in Chittagong found him innocent of all charges.

In January 2019, Hossain was among a number of senior Awami League leaders who were dropped from the new Cabinet of Ministers.

Businesses 

He is co-owner of Sayeman Beach Resort, formerly "Sayemon Hotel". His father Sayedur Rahman built the hotel in 1964. In he converted it into a resort with 75 rooms as the new owner.

References

1943 births
Living people
University of Engineering and Technology, Lahore alumni
Bangladeshi businesspeople
Awami League politicians
Jatiya Party politicians
1st Jatiya Sangsad members
3rd Jatiya Sangsad members
7th Jatiya Sangsad members
9th Jatiya Sangsad members
10th Jatiya Sangsad members
11th Jatiya Sangsad members
Housing and Public Works ministers of Bangladesh
Civil Aviation and Tourism ministers of Bangladesh
Recipients of the Independence Day Award
People from Mirsharai Upazila